Panormus or Panormos was a harbour on the east coast of ancient Attica. Panormus was captured by Alexander of Pherae during the latter's expedition in Attica. The Athenian admiral Leosthenes defeated Alexander, but Alexander escaped from being blockaded in Panormus, took several Attic triremes, and plundered Piraeus.

Its site is located near the modern Panormo.

References

Populated places in ancient Attica
Former populated places in Greece